Joseph Chike Edozien, CFR, JP, the Asagba or traditional ruler of Asaba, Delta State, Nigeria was born on 28 July 1924 in Asaba.

Family
His father was Nathaniel Okafor Edozien a direct descendant of Nnebisi the founder of Asaba, and one of the most senior indigenous officials of the Nigerian Coal Corporation in Enugu. His mother, Nwakuso Edozien née Odogwu, was the daughter of a prominent Asaba chief, and a notable trader.

Education
His father sent him at an early age to live with an uncle who was a school master in Warri, Delta State then Bendel State, Nigeria. He attended the Catholic School in Warri from 1933 to 1937. He attended Christ the Kings College, Onitsha for his secondary education from 1938 to 1942. In 1942 he attended the Higher College Yaba and then proceeded to Achimota School, Accra, Ghana.

His university education began with an admission to the University College Dublin, Ireland in 1944. He completed his BSc with honours in Physiology from the National University of Ireland in 1948, MSc in Physiology in 1950, Bachelor of Medicine and Bachelor of Surgery(MBBCh) in 1954. He won several academic awards in the process.

Career
His academic career began with an appointment as a lecturer in Clinical Biochemistry in Middlesex Hospital Medical School, University of London in 1951. In 1952 he was appointed as a Senior Lecturer in Chemical Pathology at the University College, Ibadan. He returned to Ibadan after further studies in Ireland.

In 1955, he married Modupe Smith a radiographer at the University of Ibadan teaching hospital. Her father was one of the first indigenous managers of the United Africa Company and her maternal grandfather was Herbert Macaulay, Nigeria's first surveyor and one of the principal actors in Nigeria's independence movement.

The late colonial and early independence period were exciting times in Nigeria. Educated Nigerians rapidly occupied positions of responsibility in politics, commerce and academia. Everyone's hopes were high that in a short time the country would bridge the gap with the more developed countries of Europe and North America. The euphoric mood permeated the University of Ibadan, and Edozien's groundbreaking research in nutrition helped win it a reputation as a rising academic centre. He was appointed a professor in 1961 and became the Dean of the Faculty of Medicine in 1962.

Exile
Edozien's career at Ibadan ended in 1967, a casualty of the political crisis that ended the euphoria of the late 1950s and early 1960s and resulted in the coups of 1966 and eventually led to the Nigerian Civil War. In 1967 he was instrumental in the efforts to establish the University of Benin in the newly created Midwestern Region of Nigeria. He was also implicated in the plots that resulted in the Biafran invasion of the Midwestern Region at the beginning of the civil war and was forced to flee the country.

After a period as a refugee in France, he was appointed as a professor of Nutrition at the Massachusetts Institute of Technology, Cambridge, MA. In 1971 he became a professor and head of Department of Nutrition, of the School of Public Health of the University of North Carolina.

Nigeria

In 1990 Edozien was appointed the Chairman of the Nigerian Institute of Medical Research. Shortly thereafter he was selected to become the 13th Asagba of Asaba. In 2012, he was appointed the Eze Ndieze. He retired as a Professor Emeritus of the University of North Carolina and returned to Nigeria in 1991.

Edozien's tenure as the Asagba of Asaba has coincided with dramatic changes in the character of the town. When the government of President Ibrahim Babangida created Delta State out of the old Bendel State, Asaba was chosen as the capital. Its new status as the seat of the state government has brought much of the chaotic development associated with contemporary Nigerian urbanization. The population of the town has grown and the influx of non-Asaba indigenes has strained the traditional institutions of the town.

A central theme of Edozien's tenure as the Asagba has been the challenge balancing rapid development, modernization of traditional norms and institutions with preservation of the positive aspects and moderating influence of traditional values. Several on-going initiatives such as the Asaba permanent palace and civic centre and the documentation of the town's traditional laws and customs have sought to balance these concerns.

Edozien remains an important figure in modern-day Nigerian affairs. President Olusegun Obasanjo conferred the national honour of Commander of the Federal Republic on him in 2003. He also remains one of the most respected traditional rulers who encourage and promote mutual coexistence, especially between the people in the south and Northern Nigeria.

He is also the Chancellor of the Federal University of Agriculture, Abeokuta.

References

1925 births
Living people
Nigerian pathologists
Alumni of University College Dublin
Alumni of the National University of Ireland
Academics of the University of London
Academic staff of the University of Ibadan
Massachusetts Institute of Technology School of Science faculty
University of North Carolina at Chapel Hill faculty
Christ the King College, Onitsha alumni
Nigerian expatriate academics in the United States
Abiodun family
University of Benin (Nigeria) people
Federal University of Agriculture, Abeokuta people
Nigerian expatriates in the United Kingdom
People of the Nigerian Civil War
Nigerian expatriates in France